Hamirpur district may refer to:

 Hamirpur district, Himachal Pradesh
 Hamirpur district, Uttar Pradesh

District name disambiguation pages